François-Éric Gendron (15 March 1954 in Fontainebleau, Seine-et-Marne) is a French actor.  He is the son of French cellist Maurice Gendron. He is the main French voice actor of Sean Bean.

Filmography

Film

1978: Violette Nozière - 1st Student
1979: Confidences pour confidences - Paul-Louis
1979: Le temps des vacances - Laurent
1981: Une robe noire pour un tueur - Robert
1981: Les hommes préfèrent les grosses (directed by Jean-Marie Poiré) - Adrien
1983: Life Is a Bed of Roses
1985: Désir (Desire) (directed by Jean-Paul Scarpitta)
1985: Eternal Fire - Henry Robillot
1985: Le Quatrième Pouvoir - Remy Marie
1987: Cloud Waltzing (TV Movie, Yorkshire Television, directed by Gordon Flemyng) - François De Paul
1987: L'Ami de mon amie (directed by Eric Rohmer) - Alexandre
1988: Sotto il vestito niente II - David
1989: 3615 code Père Noël (directed by René Manzor) - Roland
1989: A deux minutes près (directed by Eric Le Hung) - Paul
1989: La Révolution française ('The French Revolution') (directed by Robert Enrico and Richard T. Heffron) - Barere (segment "Années terribles, Les")
1989: I Want to go home (directed by Alain Resnais) - Lionel Cohn-Martin
1989: Lluvia de otoño
1990: Not a Penny More, Not a Penny Less (TV Movie, directed by Clive Donner) - Frank
1990: Dames Galantes (directed by Jean-Charles Tacchella) - Bussy d'Amboise
1991: Triplex (directed by Georges Lautner) - Frank
1996: Mi nombre es sombra - Dr. Octavio Beiral
1997: ¿De qué se ríen las mujeres? - Salva
1997: Momentos robados 
1998: Em dic Sara - Adrián
2006: Du jour au lendemain - Laurent
2007: Si c'était lui... - Hubert
2010: Streamfield, les carnets noirs (directed by François Viallat) - François Viallat
2011: The Well-Digger's Daughter - Le capitaine
2012: Télé gaucho (directed by Michel Leclerc) - Le père de Victor
2017: Des amours, désamour - Edouard

Television
1980: Fortunata y Jacinta, TV series, TVE, based upon the novel by Benito Pérez Galdós 
1992-1993: Dangerous Curves - Alexandre Dorleac
1998-2010: Avocats & associés (Advocates and Associates) - Robert Carvani
2004-2006: Le Proc - Mathieu Brenner
2014: Joséphine, ange gardien'' - Cassel

References

External links
Le site officiel

1954 births
Living people
People from Fontainebleau
French male film actors
French male television actors
French male voice actors
French National Academy of Dramatic Arts alumni